Drongan, Ochiltree, Rankinston and Stair was one of 30 electoral wards of East Ayrshire Council. Originally created in 1974, the ward was initially within Cumnock and Doon Valley District Council before the local government reforms in the 1990s. The ward elected one councillor using the first-past-the-post voting electoral system.

The ward was a Labour stronghold as the party successfully held the seat at every election from 1977 until it was abolished.

In 1999, the ward was abolished and replaced by the Drongan, Stair and Rankinston and Ochiltree, Skares, Netherthird and Craigens wards.

Boundaries
The Drongan, Ochiltree, Rankinston and Stair ward was created in 1974 by the Formation Electoral Arrangements from the previous Stair and Ochiltree electoral division and the Littlemill polling district of Ayr County Council. The ward took in a rural area around the villages of Drongan, Ochiltree, Rankinston and Stair and took in an area in the west of Cumnock and Doon Valley next to its border with Kyle and Carrick District Council. The boundaries remained largely unchanged following the Initial Statutory Reviews of Electoral Arrangements in 1981 and the Second Statutory Reviews of Electoral Arrangements in 1994. After the implementation of the Local Government etc. (Scotland) Act 1994, the boundaries proposed by the second review became the Formation Electoral Arrangements for the newly created East Ayrshire Council – an amalgamation of Cumnock and Doon Valley District Council and Kilmarnock and Loudoun District Council. In 1998, the Third Statutory Reviews of Electoral Arrangements abolished the ward and split it between two different wards – Drongan, Stair and Rankinston and Ochiltree, Skares, Netherthird and Craigens – ahead of the 1999 election.

Councillors

Election results

1995 election

1992 election

1988 election

1984 election

1980 election

1977 election

1974 election

References

Wards of East Ayrshire
New Cumnock